Edward Schwarzer (11 February 1929 – 23 October 2012) was a Polish rower who competed in the 1952 Summer Olympics.

References

1929 births
2012 deaths
Polish male rowers
Olympic rowers of Poland
Rowers at the 1952 Summer Olympics
People from Krotoszyn
Sportspeople from Greater Poland Voivodeship